Harpa kolaceki is a species of sea snail, a marine gastropod mollusk, in the family Harpidae.

References

kolaceki
Gastropods described in 2011